The 1905–06 FA Cup was the 35th staging of the world's oldest association football competition, the Football Association Challenge Cup (more usually known as the FA Cup). Everton won the competition for the first time, beating Newcastle United 1–0 in the final at Crystal Palace.

Matches were scheduled to be played at the stadium of the team named first on the date specified for each round, which was always a Saturday. If scores were level after 90 minutes had been played, a replay would take place at the stadium of the second-named team later the same week. If the replayed match was drawn further replays would be held at neutral venues until a winner was determined. If scores were level after 90 minutes had been played in a replay, a 30-minute period of extra time would be played.

The Crystal Palace versus Chelsea tie in the third qualifying round led to the Football Association changing the rules. The tie was scheduled to be played on 18 November 1905, and Chelsea were also obliged to play a Football League game against Burnley on the same day. Chelsea were chasing promotion from the Second Division, so they fielded a full strength side in the league and sent a reserve team to the FA Cup match. Crystal Palace won the fixture 7–1. As a result of the outcry, the Football Association amended their rules such that teams must always field their strongest side in the FA Cup.

Calendar
The format of the FA Cup for the season had a preliminary round, four qualifying rounds, four proper rounds, and the semi-finals and final.

First Round Proper
29 of the 40 clubs from the First and Second divisions joined the 24 clubs who came through the qualifying rounds. Of the League sides not given byes to this round, Chelsea, Hull City, Leeds City and Clapton Orient were entered at the first qualifying round. Chelsea and Leeds City went out in the third qualifying round (to Crystal Palace and Hull City respectively), while the other two teams qualified. Barnsley, Bradford City, Burslem Port Vale, Burton United, Gainsborough Trinity, Glossop and Stockport County were put into the fourth qualifying round, with only Glossop going out, to Brighton & Hove Albion. Sixteen non-league clubs joined the eight League sides in winning through to the First Round Proper.

To replace the missing League teams, eleven Southern League sides were given byes to the first round to bring the total number of teams up to 64. These were:

32 matches were scheduled to be played on 13 January 1906. Six matches were drawn and went to replays in the following midweek fixture, of which one went to a second replay the following week.

Second Round Proper
The 16 second round matches were played on 3 February 1906. Six matches were drawn, with the replays taking place in the following midweek fixture. One of these, the Brighton & Hove Albion v. Middlesbrough match, went to a second replay the following week.

Third Round Proper
The eight third round matches were scheduled for 24 February 1906. There was one replay, played in the following midweek fixture.

Fourth Round Proper
The four fourth round matches were scheduled for 10 March 1906. The Newcastle United v. Birmingham game was drawn, and replayed on 14 March.

Semi-finals

The semi-final matches were played on 31 March 1906. Everton and Newcastle United won and advanced to the final.

Final

The Final was contested by Everton and Newcastle United at Crystal Palace on 21 April 1906. Everton won 1–0 with the goal scored by Alex Young.

Match details

References
General
Official site; fixtures and results service at TheFA.com
1905-06 FA Cup at rsssf.com
1905-06 FA Cup at soccerbase.com

Specific

1905-06
FA
Cup